Thomas Richard Bolin (August 1, 1951 – December 4, 1976) was an American guitarist and songwriter who played with Zephyr (from 1969 to 1971), The James Gang (from 1973 to 1974), and Deep Purple (from 1975 to 1976), in addition to maintaining a notable career as a solo artist and session musician.

Musical career

Early years
Tommy Bolin was born in Sioux City, Iowa, United States, and began playing with a band called The Miserlous before he was asked to join another band called Denny and The Triumphs in 1964 at age 13. The band included Dave Stokes on lead vocals, Brad Miller on guitar and vocals, Bolin on lead guitar, Steve Bridenbaugh on organ and vocals, Denny Foote on bass, and Brad Larvick on drums. They played a blend of rock and roll, R&B and the pop hits of the moment, and when bassist Denny Foote left the band to be replaced by the drummer's brother George Larvick Jr, they changed their name to A Patch of Blue. An album was released in 1969, Patch of Blue Live! from two 1967 concerts in Correctionville, Iowa and in Sioux City. A Patch of Blue was inducted in the Iowa Rock & Roll Hall of Fame in 1999.

Bolin moved to Boulder, Colorado in his late teens and then played in a band called American Standard (with future songwriting collaborator Jeff Cook) before joining Ethereal Zephyr, a band named after the California Zephyr train that ran between Denver and Chicago. When record companies became interested, the name was shortened to Zephyr. This band included Bolin on lead guitar, David Givens on bass, and Givens' wife Candy Givens on vocals. The band had begun to do larger venues, opening for more established acts such as Led Zeppelin. Their second album, entitled Going Back to Colorado, featured a new drummer, Bobby Berge, who would pop up from time to time in musician credits in album liner notes from Bolin's later projects.

In 1972, the 20-year old Bolin formed the fusion jazz-rock-blues band Energy. Unable to secure a record contract, the band never released an album during Bolin's lifetime. However, several recordings have been released posthumously. Bolin briefly reunited with David and Candy Givens in a band called the 4-Nikators, after which he took nearly a year off from music. During this time, he wrote close to a hundred songs.

James Gang and Billy Cobham
Stuck between the musical direction he wanted to pursue and a nearly-empty bank account, Bolin in 1973 replaced Domenic Troiano, who had replaced Joe Walsh in the James Gang. He recorded two albums: Bang in 1973 and Miami in 1974; Except for one song on Bang, Bolin wrote or co-wrote every song on these two albums.

In between the James Gang albums, Bolin played on Mahavishnu Orchestra member Billy Cobham's solo album Spectrum, which included Bolin on guitar, Cobham on drums, Leland Sklar on bass and Jan Hammer (also of Mahavishnu Orchestra) on keyboards and synthesizers. Jon Lord of Deep Purple called Spectrum "an utterly astounding album. There was Tommy Bolin just shredding away like mad. And it was just gorgeous stuff, all improvised, all just off the top of his head."

After the Miami tour, Bolin wanted out of the James Gang. He went on to do session work for numerous rock bands and also with a number of jazz artists including Alphonse Mouzon's album Mind Transplant, considered "easily one of the best fusion recordings of all time" by AllMusic reviewer Robert Taylor. He also toured with Carmine Appice and The Good Rats. At the start of 1975, Bolin was a guest studio guitarist for Canadian band Moxy during the recording of their debut album, on which Bolin contributed guitar solos for six songs.

First solo album and Deep Purple
Later in 1975, Bolin signed with Nemperor records to record a solo album. Bolin was encouraged and coached by The Beach Boys to do his own vocals on this album as well. Session players on this record included David Foster, David Sanborn, Jan Hammer, Stanley Sheldon, Jeff Porcaro, Phil Collins and Glenn Hughes (uncredited due to contractual reasons). During the recording of this album, he was contacted by Deep Purple.

After Ritchie Blackmore left Deep Purple, the band had a meeting and discussed whether to disband or try to find a replacement, and chose the latter option. David Coverdale had been listening to the Billy Cobham LP Spectrum, on which Bolin was lead guitarist for four songs. He decided he wanted Bolin in Deep Purple, and invited him over for a jam. He jammed with the band for four hours and the job was his. Deep Purple Mk IV was born. The band then relocated to Munich, Germany, to begin work on Come Taste the Band. Bolin wrote or co-wrote seven of the record's nine tracks, including the instrumental "Owed to G," which was a tribute to George Gershwin. Come Taste the Band was released in October 1975, and Australian, Japanese and US tours ensued. Bolin's solo album Teaser was released in November, but his obligations to Deep Purple meant he could not support his own album with a tour.

While the Come Taste the Band album sold moderately well and revitalized Deep Purple for a time, the concert tours had many low points. Audiences expected Bolin to play solos that sounded like Blackmore's, but the guitarists' styles were very different. Bolin's issues with hard drugs plus fellow band member Glenn Hughes' cocaine addiction, also led to several below-par concert performances. One such concert in Tokyo came after Bolin had passed out and fell asleep on his left arm for eight hours. At showtime, he was only able to play simple barre chords, with keyboardist Jon Lord having to play many of the guitar parts on the organ. Unfortunately, this concert was recorded for a live album called Last Concert in Japan. Despite pleas by band members to not release the album, it came out in Japan and found its way into the UK and the US. A better concert recording by this Deep Purple lineup was made in Long Beach, California in early 1976, and released in 1995 as King Biscuit Flower Hour Presents: Deep Purple in Concert. Deep Purple Mk IV disbanded in July 1976.

The Tommy Bolin Band and second solo album
Bolin was now free to form the Tommy Bolin Band and hit the road touring while making plans for a second solo album. The Tommy Bolin Band had a rotating cast of players which included Narada Michael Walden, Mark Stein, Norma Jean Bell, Reggie McBride, Jimmy Haslip, Max Carl Gronenthal and eventually Bolin's younger brother Johnnie Bolin on drums.

By mid-1976, CBS Records signed Bolin and he began to record Private Eyes, his second and last solo record, in June. The album was released in September and a supporting tour ensued.

Death
Bolin's tour for Private Eyes would be his final live appearances. He opened for Peter Frampton and Jeff Beck. In his final show, he opened for Beck on December 3, 1976, in Miami, and encored with a rendition of "Post Toastee." He also posed for his last photo, sitting backstage with Jeff Beck after the show, which appeared in Rolling Stone. The article in Rolling Stone stated, "Just before Bolin's final concert, Jon Marlowe of The Miami News, after an interview with the guitarist, told him, 'Take care of yourself,' to which Tommy replied, 'I've been taking care of myself my whole life. Don't worry about me. I'm going to be around for a long time.'" (Issue No. 230; page 14). Hours later, Bolin died from an overdose of heroin and other substances, including alcohol, cocaine and barbiturates. He is buried in Calvary Cemetery in Sioux City, Iowa.

Personal life 
Bolin's father Richard was of Swedish descent and his mother Barbara was the daughter of Lebanese immigrants from Ferzol, Lebanon. His maternal grandfather Abraham "Abe" Joseph was a recording musician in Lebanon before immigrating to the USA. The Bolin estate has about 15 records of his grandfather in the safe vault. He had two younger brothers named Johnnie (drummer with Black Oak Arkansas) and Rick (a singer).

In a 1975 article, Bolin called himself an entirely self-taught guitarist who plays by ear, stating, "I only ever had four lessons. I don't know any scales at all. I know what to play, but don't know any scales because I never bothered to learn any."

Tributes
In 2008, a book titled Touched By Magic: The Tommy Bolin Story by author Greg Prato was released, which featured all-new interviews with former bandmates, family members, and friends of Bolin, which recounted his entire life story. The same year, a photo of Bolin was used for the front cover for the book Gettin' Tighter: Deep Purple '68–'76, by author Martin Popoff.

In 2010, several well-known artists gathered to create a tribute album titled Mister Bolin's Late Night Revival, a compilation of 17 previously unreleased tracks written by the guitar legend. The CD includes works by HiFi Superstar, Doogie White, Eric Martin, Troy Luccketta, Jeff Pilson, Randy Jackson, Rex Carroll, Rachel Barton, Derek St. Holmes, Kimberley Dahme, and The 77s. A percentage of the proceeds from this project will benefit the Jackson Recovery Centers.

Producer Greg Hampton (who has previously worked on such archival Bolin releases as Whips and Roses) co-produced (with Gov't Mule leader Warren Haynes) a tribute to Bolin, Tommy Bolin and Friends: Great Gypsy Soul, which was released in 2012, and featured contributions from Brad Whitford, Nels Cline, John Scofield, Myles Kennedy, Derek Trucks, Steve Morse, and Peter Frampton, among many others.

Discography

Tribute albums
 Glenn Hughes, Johnnie Bolin & Friends - Tommy Bolin: 1997 Tribute (1998)
 Mister Bolin's Late Night Revival (2010)
 Tommy Bolin and Friends: Great Gypsy Soul (2012)

References

Bibliography
 Popoff, Martin (2008). Gettin' Tighter: Deep Purple '68–'76. Power Chord Press. ASIN 0-9811057-1-8
 Prato, Greg (2008). Touched by Magic: The Tommy Bolin Story. Createspace. 
 Smets, Eric (2012). Tommy Bolin: Voodoo Child (French Edition). Camion Blanc. ASIN B-00CW9WP-7-8
 Thompson, Dave (2004). Smoke on the Water: The Deep Purple Story. ECW Press.

External links
 
 Billboard.com article by Greg Prato
 "Touched by Magic" by Greg Prato
 Review of "Teaser" on "Cool Album of the Day"
 
 

1951 births
1976 deaths
20th-century American guitarists
20th-century American singers
Alcohol-related deaths in Florida
American blues guitarists
American heavy metal guitarists
American male guitarists
American people of Lebanese descent
American people of Swedish descent
American rock singers
American session musicians
Blues rock musicians
Cocaine-related deaths in Florida
Deep Purple members
Drug-related deaths in Florida
Guitarists from Iowa
James Gang members
Lead guitarists
People from Sioux City, Iowa
Singers from Iowa
Slide guitarists
20th-century American male musicians